Velkommen til Medina (Danish for "Welcome to Medina") is the second studio album by the Danish pop singer Medina. It was produced by Providers and Motrack, and released on 31 August 2009 in Denmark.

The lead single of the album, "Kun for mig", was the best selling single of 2009 in Denmark with more than 60,000 units. By January 2010, the single had spent 52 non-consecutive weeks on the Danish Singles Chart, six of them at No. 1. In September 2009, an English version was released with the title "You and I" on Parlophone in the United Kingdom. It reached No. 39 on the UK Singles Chart and No. 27 on the UK Dance Chart. The song was released as the first single from Medina's first international album, Welcome to Medina, in Germany, Austria and Switzerland on 3 May 2010. It charted at No. 9, #25 and No. 30 in the respective countries.

Track listing

Special Edition

Additional notes:
"Kung for mig (Akustisk Mix)", "Vi to (Akustisk Mix)" and "Ensom (Akustisk Mix)": produced by Jeppe Federspiel for Providersmusic
"Kun for mig (Svenstrup & Vendelboe Remix)" and "You & I (Svenstrup & Vendelboe Remix)": remixed by Kasper Svenstrup and Thomas Vendelboe
"Kun for mig (Rune RK Remix)": remix and additional production by Rune Reilly Kolsch
"You & I (Original Mix)": produced by Providers for Soulcamp Entertainment
"You & I (El Bruhn Remix)": remixed by Lasse Bruhn
"You & I (Filur Remix)": remixed by Tomas Barfod and Kasper Bjørke
"Kun for dig (featuring LOC)": produced by Providers for Soulcamp Entertainment, vocal production by Rune Rask, vocal by Liam O'Connor and Medina Valbak
"Teri Yaad (vs. Waqas)": produced by Providers for Soulcamp Entertainment, vocal by Waqas Qadri
"Velkommen til Medina (Traplite Remix)": remixed by Nicolas Brañas, Thomas Eke Ochu and Mikæl Gjøl
"Velkommen til Medina (Massimo & Dominique Remix)": remix and additional production by Mads Jensen, co-produced by Dominik Zawadzki

Credits and personnel
Written and produced by Providers and Medina for Soulcamp
Tracks 3, 7, 9: Written and produced by Motrack and Medina
Vocals: Medina
Instruments: Rasmus Stabell, Jeppe Federspiel, Christian von Staffeldt
Mixed and mastered by Anders Schumann, Jeppe Federspiel and Rasmus Stabell in the C4 studio
Track 10: Mixed and mastered by Mikkel Gemzø, Jeppe Federspiel and Rasmus Stabell in the C4 studio
Photography and artwork by Sigurd Høyen
Backstage photography by Rasmus Stabell
Make-up by Simon Rihana
Styling by Jesper Hintze and Martin Schultz
Executive producers: Rasmus Stabell, Jeppe Federspiel, Thomas Børresen

References

External links 
Velkommen Til Medina (Special Edition) at Discogs

2009 albums
Medina (singer) albums